Sarıçiçek can refer to:

 Sarıçiçek, Boğazkale
 Sarıçiçek, Karayazı
 Sarıçiçek, Posof